Serj Tankian (born August 21, 1967) is an  American singer, musician, songwriter, political activist and entrepreneur of Armenian descent. He is best known as the lead vocalist, primary lyricist, keyboardist, and occasional rhythm guitarist of heavy metal band System of a Down, which was formed in 1994.

Tankian has released five albums with System of a Down (System of a Down, Toxicity, Steal This Album!, Mezmerize, Hypnotize) and five solo albums (Elect the Dead, Imperfect Harmonies, Harakiri, Orca, Jazz-Iz-Christ, and Elasticity), as well as collaborating with musicians such as rapper Tech N9ne and folk singer Arto Tunçboyacıyan. He also released Elect the Dead Symphony, a live orchestral version of Elect the Dead featuring the Auckland Philharmonia Orchestra. He is the founder of the record label Serjical Strike Records, and is currently represented by Velvet Hammer Music and Management Group.

Tankian is regarded as one of the best vocalists in heavy metal, with praise given to his unusual delivery and his wide vocal range. In 2006, he was ranked No. 26 on the Hit Parader list of "Top 100 Heavy Metal Vocalists". A study conducted by VVN Music found that Tankian possesses a high and diverse vocal range of 4.2 octaves. In 2002, he co-founded the non-profit political activism organization Axis of Justice, alongside guitarist and fellow activist Tom Morello. In 2011, he was awarded the Armenian Prime Minister's Medal for his contributions to the recognition of the Armenian genocide and the advancement of music.

Early life
Tankian was born in Beirut, Lebanon, on August 21, 1967. He traces his ancestry to the cities of Dörtyol, Kayseri, Tokat, and Urfa, all of which are in modern-day Turkey. His four grandparents were survivors of the Armenian genocide. At age seven, he moved to the U.S. with his parents, and the family settled in Los Angeles. In his youth, he attended the bilingual Rose and Alex Pilibos Armenian School, which was also attended by his future System of a Down bandmates Daron Malakian and Shavo Odadjian. Tankian was accepted into California State University, Northridge, graduating with a marketing degree in 1989. During his sophomore year, he first began to play instruments, particularly the keyboard, and write songs. He also started his activism during his college years, attempting to draw attention to the recognition of the Armenian genocide during his time as president of the university's Armenian Students Association. He has said that his activism started with the Armenian Youth Federation (AYF) and the Shant Student Association of the Armenian Revolutionary Federation (ARF).

Career

System of a Down (1994–present)

The beginnings of System of a Down lie in a band named Soil (not to be confused with the Chicago-based band SOiL) with Tankian on vocals & keyboards, Daron Malakian on vocals & lead guitar, Dave Hakopyan on bass, and Domingo Laranio on drums. The band initially hired Shavo Odadjian as their manager before he was to transition into their rhythm guitarist.
Laranio and Hakopyan later left the band feeling that it was not going anywhere, leading to Soil splitting up.

After the split, Tankian, Odadjian and Malakian formed System of a Down, named after a poem Malakian wrote called Victims of a Down. The band recruited drummer Ontronik "Andy" Khachaturian, an old school friend of Malakian, and Odadjian who had played with Malakian in a band called Snowblind during their teens. In mid-1997, Khachaturian left the band because of a hand injury (he subsequently co-founded The Apex Theory, which included former Soil bassist Dave Hakopyan). Khachaturian was replaced by John Dolmayan. Dolmayan is also the drummer for the band Indicator and former drummer for Scars on Broadway.

The band began touring the Southern California rock clubs, building a strong following.

The band achieved commercial success with the release of five studio albums, three of which debuted at number one on the Billboard 200. System of a Down has been nominated for four Grammy Awards, and their song "B.Y.O.B." won the Best Hard Rock Performance of 2006.

In May 2006, the band announced they were going on hiatus.

On November 29, 2010, following several weeks of internet rumors, System of a Down officially announced that they would play shows in Europe during Festivals and in North America, mostly in the U.S., embarking on a tour for the following three years.

The band was in limbo of not releasing any new tracks until November 2020, when they released "Protect the Land" and "Genocidal Humanoidz", which were songs that were made to help the cause of the 2020 Nagorno-Karabakh war. The song's profits went to the Armenia Fund.

Elect the Dead, side projects, and guest appearances (2007–2009)

Tankian's breakthrough as a solo artist came with the release of his debut record Elect the Dead. The first singles from Elect the Dead are "The Unthinking Majority" and "Empty Walls". The music video "Feed Us" was released on the Swedish and UK MTV. Tankian appeared on MTV's You Rock the Deuce to promote Elect the Dead. A music video was directed and filmed for every song on the record, each by unique directors. Tankian explained, "I asked each of the directors for their visual interpretation of my work. They were asked not to write treatments and that they could make whatever they liked. The results have been overwhelmingly amazing!" Some music videos were initially released exclusively to those who purchased the limited edition of Elect the Dead, while all of the music videos, except "Money", have since been publicly released on Tankian's website and YouTube channel. Some videos have alternative versions which were originally released as well, but later altered.

Three different promo versions of the album have surfaced to the public. The instrumental promotional version, issued by Serjical Strike/Reprise Records and intended for the music and movie industry, contains instrumental versions of the twelve album tracks. Another promotional version, issued by Reprise Records and made only for individual reviewers, features the album in final master form. Before this a similar but undated promo, also under the name 'Smart Talk', was issued featuring the final versions of the songs, albeit not yet mastered. Whilst the printed track list on this version is identical to the released album, tracks ten and eleven are in fact juxtaposed on the promo itself.

The official tour for Elect the Dead commenced on October 12, 2007, with a show at Chicago's Vic Theatre. Roughly one thousand people attended the first concert. Although Tankian had stated he would not be performing any material by System of a Down, he performed "Charades" and "Blue", songs co-written by Daron Malakian, the guitarist of the band. "Blue" had previously appeared on their Fourth Demo Tape in 1998, and Charades was attempted during the 2005 Mezmerize/Hypnotize sessions, but never released (although a short video clip of Tankian and Dolmayan playing the song in a recording studio was featured on "the Making of Mezmerize/Hypnotize"). Although it is originally a song restricted to piano and vocals, Tankian used his backing band, the Flying Cunts of Chaos (F.C.C.), to provide guitars, drums, and bass. The songs "Beethoven's Cunt", "Empty Walls", and "Sky Is Over" are available as downloadable content for the video game Rock Band. A portion of the song "Lie Lie Lie" is currently featured in the opening title sequence of NBC's Fear Itself, a horror anthology show from the creators of Masters of Horror, and can be viewed on the show's main website.

Tankian sang with Les Rita Mitsouko on the song "Terminal Beauty". Also, he sang with the band Fair to Midland during a live improvisational version of their song "Walls of Jericho", from the album Fables from a Mayfly: What I Tell You Three Times Is True, which was a massive hit with fans.

Tankian is also politically involved. Together with Tom Morello, he founded the organization Axis of Justice and often speaks publicly against violence and injustice in the world. Tankian released a new song "Fears" in November 2008 exclusively in support of Amnesty International's Global Write-A-Thon.

On March 16, 2009, Tankian performed an orchestral version of the album Elect the Dead with the Auckland Philharmonia Orchestra in New Zealand. The live performance was captured in a CD/DVD titled Elect the Dead Symphony, which was released on March 9, 2010.

In 2009, Tankian collaborated with the band Viza (previously known as Visa) for their track "Viktor". Viza is signed to Tankian's Serjical Strike label.

Imperfect Harmonies (2010) 
Tankian's second solo album was originally due in 2009. It is said to be more of a jazz and orchestral based sound. Tankian said of the second album:  The album had the working title Music Without Borders, however, the final album title is Imperfect Harmonies. On June 23, 2010, a promo single from his upcoming album Imperfect Harmonies was released called "Borders Are". The first radio single from Imperfect Harmonies, "Left of Center", was released on July 13, 2010. A third single, "Disowned Inc." was released on August 9, 2010. Imperfect Harmonies was released on September 21, 2010. Preceding the album's release, two contests were announced (one consisting of brainteasers related to the album/song titles, the other an art contest) in which fans could win prizes such as Tankian's autograph and merchandise. On August 22, 2010, a music video for "Left o Center" was released on Tankian's MySpace account.

The premiere date for Tankian and Sater's Prometheus Bound at the American Repertory Theater was February 25, 2011. Tankian said that collaborating on the show has been a great learning experience for him. "I've been using a lot of my archives, a lot of different types of music that I had already put together for underscoring and what not," he said. "It's quite diverse, from noise to jazz to electronic stuff to hip-hop songs to rock songs to cool, piano dark underscores, and that's a whole different bag of tricks there because it's always evolving. Unlike a film score that's very linear and you get a scene to score for, this is something where you do another workshop and one song is gone, that underscore changes to 20 seconds and they need something else on the spot. Everything's always changing until the show comes, so it's quite interesting."

In January 2011, Tankian released a music video for his song "Reconstructive Demonstrations" from his album Imperfect Harmonies. Tankian also announced on his Facebook page, during the video's release, that a new EP entitled Imperfect Remixes would be released sometime within 2011. On March 1, Tankian released Imperfect Remixes and the music video for "Goodbye", a remix of "Gate 21" from Imperfect Harmonies.

Tankian co-wrote a musical with the American playwright Steven Sater. It is based on the Ancient Greek tragedy Prometheus Bound. It opened at the American Repertory Theater on March 14, 2011.

Harakiri (2012), Orca (2013), and Jazz-Iz-Christ (2013)

In early July 2011, Tankian posted a video on YouTube showing two samples of new songs. During the video he said "next year". In multiple interviews he has stated that he has been working on a rock record that will be released in 2011, and some side projects including jazz, electronic, and symphonic records. It was later confirmed that his third album would be called Harakiri and will be released on July 10, 2012. In 2012, he planned for this to be the first of four new albums. The first single from Harakiri, "Figure It Out", was released on May 1. A music video for the song appeared on Tankian's official YouTube page. A second single from the album, "Cornucopia", was released on June 10. A third single, title track "Harakiri", was made available as a preorder bonus from Tankian's website on June 20.

On August 12, 2011, Tankian traveled to Armenia, where he was received at Government House by then-Prime Minister Tigran Sargsyan, who awarded him with a Commemorative Medal for his "contribution to the recognition of the Armenian Genocide and the advancement of music". Tankian promised to return and put on a concert to commemorate the 100th anniversary of the Armenian Genocide, which he did on April 24, 2015, playing for free for over two hours in Yerevan's Republic Square.

He released his fourth studio album Orca Symphony No. 1 on June 25, 2013. The album takes the form of a classical symphony. A professionally sampled studio version was released on November 30, 2012, while the live recorded version was released on June 25, 2013, through Serjical Strike Records.

His fifth studio album Jazz-Iz-Christ was released on July 23, 2013, by Serjical Strike Records. The release features Tankian's vocals on only four of the 15 tracks; all others are instrumental, except for "End of Time", which features a female vocalist. In 2014, he collaborated with Italian DJ Benny Benassi for the single "Shooting Helicopters".

On April 9, 2013, Tankian collaborated with Device, a project led by Disturbed frontman David Draiman. He had a guest appearance on the song "Out of Line" on Device's self-titled album.
Tankian also appeared on the Tech N9ne album Something Else in 2013 on the song "Straight Out the Gate".

Film scores (20172019) 
He was a surprise guest performer for the Game of Thrones Live Concert Experience in Los Angeles on March 25, 2017, singing "The Rains of Castamere." His rendition of the song also made it onto the soundtrack for the eighth season of Game of Thrones in 2019.

In June and July 2017, he was a guest on multiple shows of the Prophets of Rage during System of a Down's European tour, singing "Like a Stone" in memory of his friend, Audioslave's Chris Cornell.

In November 2017, Swedish independent label Woah Dad! acquired the albums that Tankian recorded for Reprise Records.

Tankian composed music for I Am Not Alone, a 2019 documentary film about the 2018 Armenian revolution. He was also an executive producer of the film.

Fuktronic (2020) 
Fuktronic, an electronic music collaboration with Mindless Self Indulgence's Jimmy Urine was released in May 2020, after the duo released a sample on SoundCloud. Fuktronic is described as "the team of Serj Tankian and Jimmy Urine from Mindless Self Indulgence, making a soundtrack for the ultimate British Gangster Film. It's an electronic album with 12 tracks (4 instrumental and 8 tracks that have original scripted dialogue that portrays the trials and tribulations of a fresh out of prison British gangster who hasn't learned his lesson)."

Elasticity (2021) 
Tankian released his first ever EP titled Elasticity on March 19, 2021. He announced the release of his EP, and released the title track "Elasticity", along with a music video for it, on February 5, 2021. In his announcement, Tankian stated "When I conceived possibly doing another record with the guys from System of a Down a few years back, I started working on a set of songs that I arranged in rock format for that purpose, As we weren't able to see eye to eye on the vision going forward with a SOAD album, I decided to release these songs under my moniker." The EP features songs like "Electric Yerevan", which is described as a "rallying cry" for Armenia, "Rumi", a poetic song about Tankian's son, and "Your Mom", which has been described as a "political mash-up".

Perplex Cities (2022) 
Tankian released his second EP titled Perplex Cities on October 21, 2022.

Artistry

Influences

Tankian grew up listening to traditional Armenian music in his exiled community in Lebanon and sang it with his father Khatchadour Tankian. He discovered pop music only once his family moved to Los Angeles in the 1970s via the Bee Gees' soundtrack to Saturday Night Fever, that led him to delve into it. In his 20s, he bought every record by the Beatles, whom he has called the most "universal" artists he is aware of. Tankian said that the first hard rock album that left an impact on him was 1992's Angel Dust by Faith No More. When System of a Down toured with Faith No More singer Mike Patton, who at the time fronted his other band Mr. Bungle on the 2000 SnoCore Tour, Tankian said that both vocalists "had some of the most interesting conversations" of his life. Besides the experimental vocals of Patton, Tankian is greatly influenced by Frank Zappa, especially by his albums Sheik Yerbouti and Joe's Garage.

Tankian holds in high regard the soundtrack of The Good, the Bad and the Ugly by Ennio Morricone, and the albums Decoy by Miles Davis and …And Justice for All by Metallica. He also much admires the reinvention that the British band Radiohead went through in their 2000 record Kid A, saying that it serves as an example to other artists.

Other ventures
In 2018, Tankian founded Kavat Coffee, a company that focuses on Armenian coffee.

Views and activism
Tankian is passionate about human rights, recognition of genocides, and social justice. These traits have helped to shape his lyrical style. He has organized and participated in many protests, from Armenian genocide recognition to Axis of Justice (AOJ) protests held by him and AOJ co-founder Tom Morello. He also covers current issues in his music. In his music, issues like the War on Terror, overpopulation, genocide, environmentalism, and the American prison system are addressed. He and his System of a Down bandmates were featured in the 2006 documentary film Screamers, which covers the United States' position on genocide. In the film, Tankian interviews his grandfather, Stepan Haytayan, a survivor of the Armenian genocide, who recounts his experience of it.

Views on religion
Tankian said in an interview that he has "the same religion as that tree over there". He said, "It's a mix of Native American, Christian, Buddhist, and Transcendental ideas. I like to think of earth as mother. I like to think of sky as grandfather. God has been used for ulterior motives." In another interview, he said, "I believe very firmly that indigenous populations had a really good, intuitive understanding of why we're here. And we're trying to gain that same understanding through psychology and intellect in modern civilization."

Political views
Following the September 11 attacks, Tankian wrote an essay in which he stated, "If we carry out bombings on Afghanistan or elsewhere to appease public demand, and very likely kill innocent civilians along the way, we'd be creating many more martyrs going to their deaths in retaliation against the retaliation. As shown from yesterday's events, you cannot stop a person who's ready to die."

In the 2008 Democratic Party primaries, Tankian originally supported Dennis Kucinich, but subsequently stated that Barack Obama "presents the best possible scenario for a hopeful future, but I don't personally put my trust in any political office". In the 2016 Democratic Party primaries, he endorsed Bernie Sanders and wrote on Facebook, "When it comes to standing up to the oligarchs, leading the fight for civil rights, income equality, and so much more, no other politician has been so consistent and incorruptible as Bernie Sanders." He further praised Sanders, "He's said what he's done and he'd done what he says in the Senate. All his contributions are from private individuals; everyone else's are from major donors and corporations. It does not take a genius to see who's working for whom here."

Concerning the Syrian Civil War, Tankian advocates negotiating with Bashar al-Assad, letting Iran deal with Islamic State of Iraq and Syria (ISIS), whom he accused Saudi Arabia, Qatar, and Turkey of supporting.

Tankian has stated he supported Bernie Sanders' bid during the 2020 US Democratic Party primaries and that although it was "frustrating" for his brother in law John Dolmayan to support Donald Trump, he added that they are "on the same page with Armenian issues."

Tankian is also friendly with current Armenian Prime Minister Nikol Pashinyan, who wrote a song called "Hayastane" which Tankian performed in April 2020. Tankian was also an executive producer and composer for the documentary I Am Not Alone, which chronicled the rise of Pashinyan.

Tankian is a supporter of the Black Lives Matter protests, as he stated in his interview with h-pem.

In 2020, Tankian condemned the actions of Azerbaijan in the 2020 Nagorno-Karabakh conflict and expressed his support to Armenia and the Republic of Artsakh. Since September 27, 2020, when the war broke, Tankian has been very active on social media, posting daily messages and has spoken to a number of media outlets about the issue, including Forbes.

Animal rights and environmental issues
Tankian is an advocate of environmental and animal protection. He became a vegetarian, claiming in an interview with PETA that his change was due to "touring and its variety of edible crap", and he also felt it was "instinctive somewhat". Furthermore, he also feels the need for respect towards "mother earth". In July 2009, he signed a PETA petition against the slaughtering methods of chickens in KFC slaughterhouses.

Personal life
On June 9, 2012, Tankian married his long-time girlfriend Angela Madatyan, an Armenian woman from Vanadzor, in a private ceremony in Simi Valley, California. On October 24, 2014, he announced that they had a son named Rumi. The family lives intermittently between Warkworth, New Zealand and Los Angeles as of 2015. Tankian is the brother-in-law of his System of a Down bandmate John Dolmayan, as their respective wives are sisters.

Discography

Solo 

 Elect the Dead (2007)
 Imperfect Harmonies (2010)
 Harakiri (2012)
 Orca Symphony No. 1 (2013)
 Fuktronic (2020)
 Cool Gardens Poetry Suite (2021)
 Cinématique Series: Illuminate (2021)
 Cinématique Series: Violent Violins (2021)

With System of a Down

 System of a Down (1998)
 Toxicity (2001)
 Steal This Album! (2002)
 Mezmerize (2005)
 Hypnotize (2005)

With Jazz-Iz-Christ
 Jazz-Iz-Christ (2013)

Collaboration albums
 Serart (2003) (with Arto Tunçboyacıyan)
 Enter the Chicken (2005) (with Buckethead)
Fuktronic (2020) (with Jimmy Urine)

Video games 

 Total Paranoia - Batman: Arkham City (2011)
 No Tomorrow - Metal: Hellsinger (with Two Feathers) (2022)

Bibliography
Cool Gardens, 2001, MTV Books
Glaring Through Oblivion, 2011, It Books

Filmography 
Screamers (2006)
My Little Prince (2012)
The Last Inhabitant (2016)
1915 (2016)
Furious (Легенда о Коловрате) (2017)
Spitak (Спитак) (2018)
Truth to Power (2021)
 Crime Scene, The Texas Killing Fields (2022)
Madoff: The Monster of Wall Street (2023)

Awards and nominations

System of a Down has been nominated for four Grammy Awards, of which they won one in 2006 for "Best Hard Rock Performance" for their song "B.Y.O.B.".

Grammy Awards 

|-
|align="center"|
|"Chop Suey!"
|align="center"|Best Metal Performance
|
|-
|align="center"|
|"Aerials"
|align="center" rowspan="3"|Best Hard Rock Performance
|
|-
|align="center"|
|"B.Y.O.B."
|
|-
|align="center"|
|"Lonely Day"
|

General 
 In 2005, System of a Down won an MTV Europe Music Award for Best Alternative.
 In 2006, System of a Down won an MTV Good Woodie Award for their song "Question!".

References
Notes

Citations

External links
 
 
 
 

 
1967 births
American people of Armenian descent
American people of Lebanese descent
Lebanese people of Armenian descent
Lebanese emigrants to the United States
Musicians from Beirut
Armenian expatriates in New Zealand
Lebanese expatriates in New Zealand
Armenian rock musicians
Lebanese rock musicians
American anti–Iraq War activists
American anti-war activists
Lebanese anti-war activists
Anti-corporate activists
American essayists
American multi-instrumentalists
Lebanese multi-instrumentalists
American rock pianists
American male pianists
Heavy metal singers
American male songwriters
American baritones
Grammy Award winners
Ethnic Armenian musicians
Melodica players
American heavy metal singers
System of a Down members
Living people
Singers with a four-octave vocal range
20th-century American pianists
Alternative metal singers